A Woman of Substance is a British-American three-part television drama serial, produced in 1984. It is based on the 1979 novel of the same name by Barbara Taylor Bradford.

Plot 
In 1970, Emma Harte is a wealthy, formidable businesswoman. Just about to turn 80, she has spent her life making a vast business empire, including the world-famous Harte's Department Store in London, as well as extensive holdings in property and oil. While on a business trip to Texas with her grandchild, Paula, Emma informs her that she will be her successor.

On their arrival back in London, Emma learns that her two sons (Kit and Robin) are plotting behind her back to force her to retire so that they can break up her business and sell it off. Devastated but determined, Emma changes her will, choosing to leave her business interests to her grandchildren instead.

The story then goes back to the beginning of the 20th century, when Emma was a teenager and working as a servant at Fairley Hall in rural Yorkshire. Her father, Jack, and two brothers, Winston and Frank, also work for the Fairley family, who own several local businesses including a mill and a brickyard. After the death of their mother, Winston joins the Royal Navy. Meanwhile, Emma becomes romantically involved with the Fairley's younger son, Edwin, but when she becomes pregnant, Edwin is horrified and refuses to marry her. Wanting to begin a new life for herself and her unborn child, Emma moves to Leeds on the advice of her friend, Shane "Blackie" O'Neill, an Irish navvy who is hired to do repairs at Fairley Hall. To protect herself and her child from the stigma of an illegitimate birth, Emma tells her landlady and new friends that she is married to a sailor currently away at sea.

While looking for work, Emma meets Abraham Kallinski, a Jew whom she rescues from an anti-Semitic attack by local youths. Abraham introduces Emma to his wife, Janessa, and grown sons, David and Victor. When Emma tells them she is looking for work, Abraham immediately offers her a job in his textile factory.

As the birth of her baby approaches, Blackie arranges for Emma to meet another friend of his, Laura Spencer. They become good friends and Emma moves into Laura's house, and also starts a new job at Thompson's Mill. Some time later, Emma gives birth to a daughter and names her Edwina. As Emma needs to work to support them, her cousin Freda takes Edwina. After a year of working at two jobs, Emma makes enough money to rent a shop in Armley, in which she sells fabrics, clothing, and luxury food goods. This shop is a success and Emma's business expands to two shops, then three. Not expecting to see the Fairleys, she is horrified when Edwin's vile brother Gerald visits. He has found her after seeing she worked at Thompson's Mill, now owned by his father. He tells her that Edwin will soon be engaged and demands she tell him where the child is. Emma refuses and after a violent confrontation, Emma realizes she needs someone to protect her. Worried that Gerald will return, she marries her landlord, Joe Lowther. Soon after their marriage, they have a son named Kit.

Emma's business continues to expand and she goes into partnership with the Kallinskis. Unfortunately, her private life doesn't run as smoothly. Joe is killed in the Battle of the Somme and Laura, now married to Blackie, dies giving birth to a son, Bryan. Emma takes him and Bryan lives with Emma and her children until Blackie returns from the war.

In early 1918, Emma meets Australian Army officer Paul McGill. They fall in love, but he returns to the war in France after recovering from a leg injury. After the war ends he goes home and, despite promising to write, never does. Emma is hurt and disappointed when she finds out that Paul has gone back to his estranged wife, and turns to an acquaintance Arthur Ainsley for consolation, agreeing to marry him, though more out of convenience than anything else. She and her new husband later have twins, Robin and Elizabeth, but the marriage is short-lived when Paul returns. Emma is angry but calms down when Paul explains that he tried to write to her but his secretary hid the letters. They start seeing each other again and she divorces her husband after giving birth to Paul's child, a daughter whom they name Daisy after Paul's mother.

However, Emma has never forgiven the Fairley family for the way in which she and her own family were treated by them. Now rich and powerful, she buys up all of the Fairley's holdings, including Fairley Hall, which she intends to have demolished and the grounds used as a public park.

In February 1939, seeing a new war on the horizon, Paul goes to Australia to convince his wife to give him a divorce so that he can marry Emma. While there, he is seriously injured in a car crash and almost dies. He survives but is told that he will be dead within a year so he redraws his will, leaving almost everything to Emma and Daisy (including his vast shares in the Sitex oil company), and then he commits suicide. Emma is devastated but eventually recovers enough to look after her family and business empires.

Emma's life goes on. Her children marry and have children of their own – Edwina, Kit and Robin have one child each, Elizabeth marries repeatedly and has four and Daisy marries and has two, one of whom is Paula.

Back in 1970, where the story first began, Emma invites her family to her country estate in Yorkshire for her 80th birthday. After dinner, Emma tells them that she has changed her will, effectively cutting her own children out for their deceit and leaving everything to her grandchildren instead. She announces that Paula will inherit the Harte's Department Store chain. Emma's children are furious but reluctantly accept £1 million each as "pay-offs" after they each sign an agreement that they will not try to contest her will after she dies. Emma also gives her blessing to Paula's engagement to Jim Fairley, Edwin's grandson, thus ending her lifelong hatred of the Fairley family.

Main cast
 
 Jenny Seagrove as Young Emma Harte
 Deborah Kerr as Emma Harte
 Barry Bostwick as Major Paul McGill
 Diane Baker as Laura O'Neill
 Liam Neeson as Blackie O'Neill
 Miranda Richardson as Paula McGill Amory
 Peter Chelsom as Edwin Fairley
 John Duttine as Joe Lowther
 Peter Egan as Adam Fairley
 George Baker as Bruce McGill
 Mick Ford as Frank Harte
 Christopher Gable as Arthur Ainsley
 Christopher Guard as Gerald Fairley
 Dominic Guard as Winston Harte
 Del Henney as Jack Harte
 Gayle Hunnicutt as Olivia Wainwright
 Nicola Pagett as Adele Fairley
 Joris Stuyck as David Kallinski
 Meg Wynn Owen as Elizabeth Harte
 Megs Jenkins as Mrs. Turner
 Harry Landis as Abraham Kallinski
 John Mills as Henry Rossiter
 Barry Morse as Murgatroyd

Production 
The drama was produced by the British company Portman-Artemis, and was co-financed by the UK's Channel 4 and the US-based OPT Organisation (a subsidiary of MCA Television). Producer Diane Baker (who also co-stars as Laura Spencer) first met Taylor-Bradford prior to the novel being published, whilst Taylor-Bradford was working for a newspaper in New York and was interviewing Baker (who worked predominantly as an actress at that time) for an article about interior design. After the novel was published, Baker contacted Taylor-Bradford to obtain the television rights, remortgaging her house in order to do so.

Don Sharp was not the original director. He says the producers were unhappy with the progress of the film during pre-production; the original director and several heads of production were fired, and Sharp was brought in four weeks before filming. Sharp says it was he who cast Jenny Seagrove and that Diane Baker recommended Liam Neeson.

The series was largely filmed in Yorkshire in the north of England, and locations include Brimham Rocks (where Emma first meets Blackie on the moors), Richmond (for most of Armley), and the main shop-front of the Emma Harte Emporium in London. The original Armley store was a then disused row of shops in Crown Street Darlington (opposite the towns main post office). Filing took twelve weeks.

The budget was $6 million. Sharp said the original cut ran long because they did not have enough time during pre production to cut the script as thoroughly as he would have liked.

Transmission 
The drama was aired by Channel 4 in the UK over three nights from 2 to 4 January 1985. The broadcast of the final part on 4 January drew 13.8 million viewers, which remains the channel's highest ever audience. It was shown in limited syndication in the United States several weeks before the British transmission, in order to qualify for the 1985 Primetime Emmy Award.

Award nominations 
For the 1985 Primetime Emmy Award, A Woman of Substance was nominated for Outstanding Limited Series, and Deborah Kerr was nominated for Outstanding Supporting Actress in a Limited Series or Special.

Sequels 
Barbara Taylor-Bradford's sequel, Hold the Dream, was produced as an eponymous serial in 1986, again starring Deborah Kerr and Jenny Seagrove, though Seagrove now played the role of Paula. It was again directed by Don Sharp, who spent most of the decade directing in this genre.

A second sequel, To Be the Best, was adapted in 1992 and starred Lindsay Wagner as Paula.

References

External links 
 
 

1980s British television miniseries
Channel 4 original programming
Television shows based on British novels
Films directed by Don Sharp
1985 British television series debuts
1985 British television series endings
1980s British drama television series
1980s business films
Operation Prime Time
English-language television shows
Television shows set in County Durham